Saint Petronius (died ca. 450 AD) was bishop of Bologna during the fifth century.  He is a patron saint of the city.  Born of a noble Roman family, he became a convert to Christianity and subsequently a priest.  As bishop of Bologna, he built the Church of Santo Stefano.

Life
The only certain historical information we possess concerning him is derived from a letter written by Bishop Eucherius of Lyon (died 450–455) to Valerianus, and from Gennadius' De viris illustribus.

Eucherius writes that the holy Bishop Petronius was then renowned in Italy for his virtues. From Gennadius we receive more detailed information: Petronius belonged to a noble family whose members occupied high positions at the imperial Court at Milan and in the provincial administrations at the end of the fourth and the beginning of the fifth centuries.

His father (also named Petronius) was probably praefectus praetorio, since a Petronius filled this office in Gaul in 402–408. The treatise De ordinatione episcopi, bearing the name of Petronius as author, is by the elder Petronius, who was a man of eloquence. Eucherius seems to suggest that the future bishop also held an important secular position. 

Even in his youth Petronius devoted himself to the practices of asceticism, and seems to have visited the Holy Places in Jerusalem, perhaps on a pilgrimage.

About 432 he was elected and consecrated Bishop of Bologna, where he erected a church to Saint Stephen (Santo Stefano), the building scheme of which was in imitation of the shrines on Golgotha and over the Holy Sepulchre in Jerusalem. He also built the church of Santa Lucia, and the original church of Santi Bartolomeo e Gaetano.

Petronius is believed to have written a work on the life of the Egyptian monks (Vitæ patrum Ægypti monachorum); the author of this work, however, is Rufinus of Aquileia. Morin has published a sermon entitled "In die ordinationis vel Natale episcopi" (Revue bénédictine, 1897, 3 sq.), which Gennadius ascribes to Bishop Petronius of Verona, whom Czalpa holds is Petronius of Bologna, but this assignment is not certain.

According to Gennadius, Petronius died during the reign of Emperor Theodosius II and Valentinian III, i. e., before 450.

Veneration
In the twelfth century appeared a legendary life of the saint, whose relics were discovered in 1141. Shortly afterwards a church was erected in his honour at Bologna; a second, San Petronio Basilica, planned on a large seal, was begun in 1390. In 2000, his relics were moved from Santo Stefano to the Basilica of San Petronio.   

The feast of St. Petronius is celebrated on 4 October. 

In iconography, he is depicted as a bishop holding a model of Bologna in his hand.

References

Sources
Ferguson, George (1961). Signs and Symbols in Christian Art New York: Oxford University Press, 1961, p. 139.

Filippini, F. (1948). S. Petronio vescovo di Bologna. Storia e leggenda. Bologna 1948. 
Lanzoni, Francesco (1832). ed. G. Cantagalli. Cronotassi dei vescovi di Bologna dai primordi alla fine del secolo XIII. Bologna 1932, pp. 30–33.  
Mathisen, Ralph W. (1981), "Petronius, Hilarius and Valerianus: Prosopographical Notes on the Conversion of the Roman Aristocracy," Historia.  Zeitschrift für Alte Geschichte Band 30 (1981), pp. 106–112.
Paolini, Lorenzo (2015). "Petronio, santo". Dizionario Biografico degli Italiani Volume 82 (2015) 

450 deaths
Converts to Christianity from pagan religions
Italian saints
Bishops of Bologna
5th-century Italian bishops
5th-century Christian saints
Petronii
Year of birth unknown